The Rockland team was a minor league baseball team based in Rockland, Maine in the 1884 and 1897 seasons. Rockland teams played as members of the 1884 Connecticut League and 1897 Maine State League. The 1897 team was the final minor league team based in Rockland.

History
Rockland was home to early baseball, as the Rockland Base Ball Club played as members the 1884 Independent level Connecticut League.

In 1897, Rockland joined the Independent level Maine State League. The Maine State League briefly played in the 1897 season as a six–team league, beginning play on May 20, 1897. The Augusta Kennebecs, Bangor Millionaires, Belfast Pastimes, Lewiston and Portland teams joined Rockland in league play. During the season, the Augusta team disbanded on June 26, 1897 and the Rockland team disbanded on July 1, 1897. With the two teams disbanded, the league entire league folded on July 5, 1897.

Rockland had a 10–19 record in the 1897 season when the team folded. The Rockland team was 6th in the league standings when the team folded, positioned behind 1st place Portland. The 1897 final Maine State League standings featured Portland (21–6), Lewiston (15–14), Bangor Millionaires (12–19) and Belfast Pastimes (10–16) as the four remaining teams. The Augusta Kennebecs had a record of 14–8 and Rockland 10–19 when those teams folded.

The 1897 team was the last minor league hosted in Rockland, Maine to date.

The ballpark
The name of the home ballpark for the minor league Rockland teams is not known.

Year–by–year records

Notable alumni
Ralph Miller (1897)

References

External link
Baseball Reference

Professional baseball teams in Maine
Defunct baseball teams in Maine
Baseball teams established in 1897
Baseball teams disestablished in 1897
Maine State League teams
Rockland, Maine
Knox County, Maine